Braheme Days Jr. (born January 18, 1995) is an American shot putter.

He won a bronze medal at the 2011 World Youth Championships in Athletics.

Prep
Braheme won his first National HS Shot Put title at the NBIN meet in New York, New York with a throw of 21.00m(5.45k)

Days attended Bridgeton High School and was selected by The Press of Atlantic City as their Boys' Track and Field Athlete of the Year in 2011, as well as Indoor Athlete of the Year 2012.

He was a USA Today All-American track and field selection in 2012.

NCAA
He eventually signed to the UCLA Bruins in February 2013.

Braheme is the current American Junior Record holder in the shot put with a distance of (6k).

References

External links

UCLA Bruins bio
DyeStat profile for Braheme Days

1995 births
Living people
Bridgeton High School alumni
People from Bridgeton, New Jersey
American male shot putters
UCLA Bruins men's track and field athletes
Sportspeople from Cumberland County, New Jersey
Track and field athletes from New Jersey